Abbos is a male given name in Uzbekistan (short for ) and a surname (variant of Abbas).

Abbos may refer to:

People
 Abbos Atoyev (born 1986), Uzbekistani amateur boxer
 Abbos Otakhonov (born 1995), Uzbekistani footballer
 Abbos Rakhmonov (born 1998), Uzbekistani freestyle wrestler

Other uses
 An ethnic slur referring to Indigenous Australians (variant of abo, derived from Aborigine)

Masculine given names